Woodpeckers are near-passerine birds of the order Piciformes.

 Woodpecker may also refer to:

Art, entertainment, and media
 Woodpecker (2008 film), a 2008 comedic film
 Woodpecker, a 2008 play by Jacob M. Appel
 Woodpeckers (2017 film), a 2017 film
 Woody Woodpecker, the Universal Pictures cartoon character
 Woodpecker Wooliams, a musical project of English musician Gemma Williams
 Woodpecker, a television ident for BBC Two, first aired in 2000 (see BBC Two '1991–2001' idents)

Brands
 Woodpecker Cider, a brand of H. P. Bulmer

Sports
 The Woodpeckers (Rugby union team) British Rugby union team
 Fayetteville Woodpeckers, a Minor League Baseball team of the Carolina League

Other uses
 Russian Woodpecker,  a type of shortwave radio interference thought to originate from the Russian Duga-3 Over-the-horizon radar transmitter 
 Woodpecker, nickname of the Type 92 Heavy Machine Gun

See also

 
 Woody Woodpecker (disambiguation)